Paraivongius is a genus of leaf beetles in the subfamily Eumolpinae. It is distributed in Africa.

Species
Subgenus Paraivongius Pic, 1936

Paraivongius akaensis Selman, 1972
Paraivongius apricus Zoia, 2017
Paraivongius armatus (Burgeon, 1941)
Paraivongius bagbelensis Selman, 1972
Paraivongius bayeri (Burgeon, 1942)
Paraivongius bequaerti (Burgeon, 1941)
Paraivongius bicolor (Lefèvre, 1885)
Paraivongius bicolor bicolor (Lefèvre, 1885)
Paraivongius bicolor arussinus (Gestro, 1895)
Paraivongius bicolorimembris (Pic, 1940)
Paraivongius bicoloripes (Pic, 1939)
Paraivongius brevicornis Zoia, 2017
Paraivongius castaneus Zoia, 2017
Paraivongius coeruleus (Bryant, 1954)
Paraivongius coffeae (Bryant, 1938)
Paraivongius collarti (Burgeon, 1941)
Paraivongius costatus (Jacoby, 1894)
Paraivongius curtus Pic, 1952
Paraivongius cyanipennis (Gerstaecker, 1871)
Paraivongius demoulinensis Selman, 1972
Paraivongius disconotatus (Pic, 1939)
Paraivongius distanti (Jacoby, 1892)
Paraivongius diversicolor Pic, 1953
Paraivongius diversipennis (Pic, 1940)
Paraivongius diversitarsis (Pic, 1952)
Paraivongius duruensis Selman, 1972
Paraivongius elisabethanus (Burgeon, 1941)
Paraivongius emaliensis (Bryant, 1954)
Paraivongius flavimanus (Jacoby, 1903)
Paraivongius flavimanus flavimanus (Jacoby, 1903)
Paraivongius flavimanus scheitzae (Burgeon, 1941)
Paraivongius flavitarsus (Jacoby, 1893)
Paraivongius fulvicornis (Jacoby, 1897)
Paraivongius fulvus Selman, 1972
Paraivongius gabonicus (Pic, 1952)
Paraivongius garambaensis Selman, 1972
Paraivongius geniculatus (Lefèvre, 1891)
Paraivongius gossypii (Bryant, 1937)
Paraivongius humeralis Zoia, 2017
Paraivongius hypomelas (Lefèvre, 1886)
Paraivongius inapicalis (Pic, 1940)
Paraivongius inexspectatus Zoia, 2017
Paraivongius interstitialis (Jacoby, 1900)
Paraivongius jacobyi Selman, 1965
Paraivongius katangensis (Burgeon, 1941)
Paraivongius kraatzi (Jacoby, 1898)
Paraivongius lepesmei (Burgeon, 1941)
Paraivongius limbatus (Lefèvre, 1891)
Paraivongius maynei (Burgeon, 1941)
Paraivongius metallicus Pic, 1936
Paraivongius micans (Gerstaecker, 1871)
Paraivongius milliaui (Burgeon, 1941)
Paraivongius mimicus Pic, 1953
Paraivongius minimus Pic, 1952
Paraivongius motoensis (Burgeon, 1941)
Paraivongius mouyassuensis Selman, 1973
Paraivongius murrayi (Baly, 1878)
Paraivongius nigripes (Jacoby, 1900)
Paraivongius nigritarsis (Lefèvre, 1891)
Paraivongius parvulus (Jacoby, 1903)
Paraivongius pauliani (Burgeon, 1941)
Paraivongius pidigalaensis Selman, 1972
Paraivongius plagiatus (Lefèvre, 1891)
Paraivongius pomorum (Bryant, 1931)
Paraivongius pseudobscurellus (Burgeon, 1942)
Paraivongius pseudoparvulus (Burgeon, 1941)
Paraivongius recticollis (Jacoby, 1898)
Paraivongius rotundatus (Burgeon, 1941)
Paraivongius ruandicus (Weise, 1912)
Paraivongius rubricollis Selman, 1972
Paraivongius rufipes (Weise, 1883)
Paraivongius rufometallicus (Pic, 1951)
Paraivongius ruwenzoricus (Burgeon, 1942)
Paraivongius saegeri Selman, 1972
Paraivongius scapularis (Burgeon, 1941)
Paraivongius semipiceus (Jacoby, 1903)
Paraivongius subaeneus (Jacoby, 1903)
Paraivongius tarsalis (Lefèvre, 1887)
Paraivongius testaceipes (Pic, 1940)
Paraivongius theresae Pic, 1952
Paraivongius uniformis (Jacoby, 1900)
Paraivongius varicolor (Lefèvre, 1891)
Paraivongius viridecinctus (Pic, 1940)
Paraivongius viridescens (Pic, 1952)
Paraivongius viridiaeneus (Jacoby, 1882)
Paraivongius viridicollis (Pic, 1940)
Paraivongius viridipes Pic, 1952
Paraivongius viridis (Jacoby, 1898)
Paraivongius viridissimus Pic, 1952
Paraivongius wittei (Burgeon, 1942)

Subgenus Micromenius Pic, 1953
Paraivongius chalceatus (Lefèvre, 1891)
Paraivongius concolor (Pic, 1953)
Paraivongius feai Zoia, 2017
Paraivongius ivoirensis Pic, 1952
Paraivongius nitidissimus (Pic, 1953)
Paraivongius obscuripes (Pic, 1952)
Paraivongius ruficeps (Pic, 1939)
Paraivongius rufus (Pic, 1940)
Paraivongius simplex (Weise, 1909)

Synonyms:
 Menius rufipes Lefèvre, 1891 (preoccupied by Paraivongius rufipes (Weise, 1883)): renamed to Paraivongius jacobyi Selman, 1965
 Paraivongius congoensis (Burgeon, 1942): moved to Afroeurydemus
 Paraivongius viridinitens (Bryant, 1954): synonym of Paraivongius parvulus (Jacoby, 1903)

References

Eumolpinae
Chrysomelidae genera
Beetles of Africa
Taxa named by Maurice Pic